Kytlice is a municipality and village in Děčín District in the Ústí nad Labem Region of the Czech Republic. It has about 500 inhabitants.

Administrative parts
Villages of Dolní Falknov, Falknov, Hillův Mlýn and Mlýny are administrative parts of Kytlice.

Notable people
Franz Xaver Zippe (1791–1863), natural philosopher and mineralogist

References

Villages in Děčín District